The Last of Us is an action-adventure survival horror game franchise created by Naughty Dog and Sony Interactive Entertainment. The series is set in a post-apocalyptic United States ravaged by cannibalistic creatures infected by a mutated fungus in the genus Cordyceps. It follows several survivors, including Joel, a smuggler who lost his daughter during the outbreak; Ellie, a young girl who is immune to the infection; and Abby, a soldier in Seattle who becomes involved in a conflict between her militia and a religious cult. The games use a third-person perspective in which the player fights against hostile humans and cannibalistic creatures with firearms, improvised weapons, and stealth.

Game director Bruce Straley and creative director Neil Druckmann led the development of the first game, The Last of Us, which was released for PlayStation 3 in June 2013. A downloadable content addition, The Last of Us: Left Behind, was released in February 2014 and follows Ellie and her best friend Riley. A remastered version, The Last of Us Remastered, was released for PlayStation 4 in July 2014. Druckmann continued to lead the development of a sequel, The Last of Us Part II, which was released for PlayStation 4 in June 2020. A remake of the first game, titled The Last of Us Part I, was released for PlayStation 5 in September 2022, and is scheduled to release for Windows in March 2023. An untitled multiplayer game is in development.

The series has received critical acclaim and has won numerous awards, including several Game of the Year recognitions; the first game has been cited as one of the greatest video games ever made, and the second won more than 320 Game of the Year awards. Games in the series are among the best-selling PlayStation 3 and PlayStation 4 games. As of January 2023, the franchise has sold over 37 million games worldwide. Strong sales and support of the series led to the franchise's expansion into other media, including a comic book in 2013, a live show in 2014, a television adaptation by HBO in 2023, a tabletop game by Themeborne in 2023, and an upcoming tabletop game by CMON.

Media

Games 

The Last of Us was released worldwide for PlayStation 3 on June 14, 2013. A remastered version, titled The Last of Us Remastered, was released for PlayStation 4 in July 2014. Twenty years after losing his daughter Sarah during the outbreak of the mutant Cordyceps fungus, Joel is tasked with escorting Ellie, a teenage girl who is immune to the infection, across a post-apocalyptic United States so the revolutionary group Fireflies can potentially create a cure. Throughout their journey, the two become closer after experiencing several traumatic events. After arriving in Salt Lake City, Ellie is prepared for surgery, which will involve killing her. Unwilling to let her die, Joel battles his way to the operating room, kills the lead surgeon, and carries the unconscious Ellie to safety. When Ellie wakes up, Joel lies to her, stating the attempts to create a cure had failed.

The Last of Us: Left Behind was released for PlayStation 3 on February 14, 2014. A downloadable expansion pack of The Last of Us,  Left Behind was included in Remastered for PlayStation 4 in 2014, and was released as a stand-alone expansion pack for PlayStation 3 and PlayStation 4 on May 12, 2015. It is set three weeks before the events of the main game, following Ellie as she spends time with her best friend Riley in an abandoned mall in Boston. Riley reveals she has been assigned to a group of Fireflies in a different city. Ellie tearfully begs Riley not to leave; Riley agrees and rips her Firefly pendant off, prompting Ellie to kiss her. They are overrun by Infected and both bitten. They briefly consider shooting themselves to prevent the infection taking over them, but instead choose to spend their final hours together.

The Last of Us Part II was released for PlayStation 4 on June 19, 2020. Four years after the events of the first game, Abby Anderson tracks down and kills Joel as revenge for murdering her father, the head Firefly surgeon. Ellie and her girlfriend Dina set out for Seattle to track down Abby. Over the course of three days, Ellie kills several of Abby's friends, while Abby befriends Lev, who has been branded an apostate after defying the traditions of the religious cult Seraphites. After Abby discovers her friends dead, she tracks down Ellie and overpowers her, but spares them at Lev's insistence. Several months later, Ellie and Dina are living on a farm. Ellie sets out to find Abby again in Santa Barbara; she discovers Abby and Lev captured and forces Abby to fight. Ellie overpowers her but has a change of heart and lets her live. Abby and Lev sail to the Fireflies, while Ellie returns to the farmhouse and finds it empty.

The Last of Us Part I was released for PlayStation 5 on September 2, 2022, and is scheduled to release for Windows on March 28, 2023. It is a remake of the first game, featuring revised gameplay, overhauled artificial intelligence, improved performance, and expanded accessibility options.

An untitled standalone multiplayer game—a sequel to the multiplayer mode of the original—is in development.

Other media 
A four-issue comic book miniseries, The Last of Us: American Dreams, was published by Dark Horse Comics from April to July 2013. Written by Druckmann and illustrated by Faith Erin Hicks, the comics serve as a prequel to the game, chronicling the journey of a younger Ellie and Riley. On July 28, 2014, the cast of the game performed a live reading of selected scenes in Santa Monica, California, with live music by game composer Gustavo Santaolalla. The performance was hosted and directed by Druckmann, with graphics by Alex Hobbs. On The Last of Us Day in September 2020, CMON announced it was developing , a tabletop game based on the series intending to focus on exploration, narrative, and survival elements. A different tabletop game, The Last of Us: Escape the Dark, was announced in November 2022, produced by Naughty Dog and Themeborne. The game will allow up to five players to control Joel, Ellie, Tommy, Tess, Bill, or Marlene and try to reach safety from enemies such as Hunters and Infected while exploring locations from the game, including the sewers, suburbs, and university. It was funded by a Kickstarter campaign, which began on November 8.

Canceled films 
On March 6, 2014, Sony announced Screen Gems would distribute a film adaptation of The Last of Us, written by Druckmann and produced by Sam Raimi. By January 2015, Druckmann had written the script's second draft, and performed a read-through with some actors. Very little work occurred following this, as Druckmann stated in April 2016 the film had entered development hell. In November 2016, Raimi stated the film was at a standstill after Sony had a disagreement with Druckmann. Druckmann stated in a 2021 interview the film fell apart as there was too much studio focus on making big action set-pieces, a concept he felt did not work well for the nature of The Last of Us which he felt was better approached as a smaller indie film. Actress Maisie Williams expressed enthusiasm in playing Ellie, and was in talks with both Druckmann and Raimi to take the role, while Kaitlyn Dever participated in a table read. In January 2020, images surfaced of an animated short film adaptation of The Last of Us by production agency Oddfellows. The 20-minute film was intended to "serve as a strong bridge" between the game and its sequel and would "reinterpret each of the chapters of the game with a unique visual treatment" but was canceled by Sony. In 2023, Druckmann said he had written a short story after the first game was released about Ellie's mother, which was intended to be adapted into an animated short film, but "it fell apart"; it was later incorporated into the television adaptation.

Television series 

In March 2020, a television adaptation of the game was announced in the planning stages at HBO; it was formally greenlit in November 2020. Druckmann and Craig Mazin wrote and executive produced the series, and both directed episodes; Ali Abbasi, Peter Hoar, Liza Johnson, Jeremy Webb, and Jasmila Žbanić also directed episodes, while additional executive producers include Carolyn Strauss and Rose Lam, Naughty Dog president Evan Wells, and PlayStation Productions's Asad Qizilbash and Carter Swan. The show is a joint production between Sony Pictures Television, PlayStation Productions, Naughty Dog, The Mighty Mint, and Word Games; it is the first show produced by PlayStation Productions. Santaolalla and David Fleming composed the score. The show stars Pedro Pascal and Bella Ramsey as Joel and Ellie, respectively. Gabriel Luna plays Tommy, Merle Dandridge reprises her role as Marlene, and Anna Torv plays Tess. Druckmann noted some of the show's scripts borrow dialogue directly from the game, while others deviate more significantly; some of the game's action-heavy tutorial sequences were changed to focus on the show's character drama, at the request of HBO. Filming for the series took place in Alberta, Canada, from July 2021 to June 2022, and it debuted on HBO and HBO Max on January 15, 2023. On January 27, 2023, less than two weeks after the series premiere, HBO renewed the series for a second season.

Cast and characters

Development and history 

Preliminary work on The Last of Us, under the codename "Project Thing" or "T1", began after the release of Uncharted 2: Among Thieves in October 2009. For the first time in the company's history, developer Naughty Dog split into two teams to work on projects concurrently; while one team developed Uncharted 3: Drake's Deception (2011), the other began work on The Last of Us. In order to run the two teams smoothly, co-presidents Evan Wells and Christophe Balestra chose game director Bruce Straley and creative director Neil Druckmann to lead development on The Last of Us. Straley, who was employed at Naughty Dog in March 1999, was selected to lead the project based on his experience and his work on previous projects, while Druckmann, an employee since 2004, was chosen for his determination and talent for design about a year into the game's production.

While at university, Druckmann had an idea to merge the gameplay of Ico (2001) in a story set during a zombie apocalypse, like that of George A. Romero's Night of the Living Dead (1968), with a lead character similar to John Hartigan from Sin City (1991–2000). The lead character, a police officer, would be tasked with protecting a young girl; however, due to the lead character's heart condition, players would often assume control of the young girl, reversing the roles. Druckmann later developed it when creating the story of The Last of Us. Druckmann views The Last of Us as a coming of age story, in which Ellie adapts to survival after spending time with Joel, as well as an exploration of how willing a father is to save his child. The Last of Us was announced on December 10, 2011, at the Spike Video Game Awards, alongside its debut trailer. The announcement ignited widespread anticipation within the gaming industry, which journalists ascribed to Naughty Dog's reputation. The game missed its original projected release date of May 7, 2013, and was pushed to June 14, 2013, worldwide for further polishing. To promote pre-order sales, Naughty Dog collaborated with several retailers to provide special editions of the game with extra content.

Naughty Dog began developing Left Behind following the release of The Last of Us with a team about half the size. Following the decision to create single-player downloadable content for the game, the development team immediately decided the story would focus on the character of Ellie; they found players of The Last of Us were interested to learn about events in Ellie's life prior to the events of the main game, particularly the events involving Riley Abel, whom Ellie mentioned in The Last of Us. In addition, they found some players were interested in the events that occurred between the Fall and Winter segments of the main game, in which Ellie cares for an injured Joel. This led to the team deciding to contrast these two events against each other, feeling it would help the story's pacing. Straley said the team felt the story justified the development of Left Behind. The shorter time frame of development for Left Behind gave the team an opportunity to trial mechanics and ideas they were unable to test on the main game.

Early story concepts for The Last of Us PartII were conceived during the development of the first game. Naughty Dog began development in 2014, soon after the release of The Last of Us Remastered. By August 2017, with the release of Uncharted: The Lost Legacy, the entire 350-person team at Naughty Dog had shifted to develop PartII. Druckmann led development as creative director and writer; he co-wrote the story alongside Halley Gross. Straley left Naughty Dog in 2017; Anthony Newman and Kurt Margenau were selected to be co-game directors for PartII. Both were hired during the development of Uncharted 2 (2009); Newman was the melee combat designer for The Last of Us, and Margenau was game director on Uncharted: The Lost Legacy. Margenau and Newman oversaw and approved the gameplay elements, such as level design and mechanics. For the final months of development, due to the COVID-19 pandemic, the team operated via remote work arrangements. In total, approximately 2,169 developers across 14 studios worked on the game.

The Last of Us PartII was announced at the PlayStation Experience event on December 3, 2016. The game missed its original projected release date of February 21, 2020, pushed to May for extra polishing, and later to June 19 due to logistical problems caused by the COVID-19 pandemic. In late April, several videos leaked online, showing cutscenes, gameplay, and significant plot details. Druckmann tweeted he was "heartbroken" for fans and for the team, who had devoted years to development. The development of PartII, according to a report by Kotakus Jason Schreier, included a crunch schedule of 12-hour work days owing to the studio culture; after the game's delay, developers continued under this schedule for the additional months. Publisher Sony Interactive Entertainment granted the developer an additional two weeks of development for bug fixes.

The existence of The Last of Us PartI was first reported in April 2021 by Bloomberg Newss Schreier. The game was announced in June 2022 at Summer Game Fest. It was released for PlayStation 5 on September 2, 2022, and is scheduled to release for Windows on March 28, 2023. Development was led by game director Matthew Gallant and creative director Shaun Escayg. Gallant previously worked as a combat designer on the original game and Uncharted 4: A Thief's End (2016), and became lead systems designer on PartII, co-leading its accessibility features. Escayg was lead cinematic animator on The Last of Us—his first game—and creative director on The Lost Legacy, followed by his work as creative director and co-writer of Marvel's Avengers (2020) at Crystal Dynamics, before returning to Naughty Dog in April 2021. Splitting their directing duties, Escayg took responsibility for the cinematics. Gallant found he resonated with the themes much more closely than during the development of the original game, having become a father in the interim. According to Escayg, the team approached the remake as "a love letter to our fans, to the franchise, and to ourselves as developers"; they felt a responsibility to preserve its essence and quality. Several of the creative leadership team of PartI worked on the original game.

A multiplayer mode was originally in development for PartII, as had been the case in The Last of Us; Newman and Margenau confirmed the existence of the multiplayer mode at E3 in June 2018. In September 2019, Druckmann and co-lead game designer Emilia Schatz noted the game would focus solely on its single-player campaign; Naughty Dog released a statement confirming the omission, adding it continued development separately but "when and where it will be realized is still to be determined". Naughty Dog increased its multiplayer-related job openings following the release of PartII in 2020. At Summer Game Fest in June 2022, Druckmann confirmed the game would receive a standalone release, and revealed the first concept art. He said the game is "as big" as Naughty Dog's single-player games, and noted it will feature new characters and a new location in the United States, suspected to be San Francisco based on the concept art. The game's development is led by co-game directors Vinit Agarwal and Anthony Newman, and narrative lead Joseph Pettinati.

Druckmann and Gross wrote a story outline for a sequel to Part II by April 2021, but noted it was not in active development. In January 2023, Druckmann said "there's more story to tell".

Reception 

Overall, The Last of Us series has been critically acclaimed and commercially successful. The first game received "universal acclaim", according to review aggregator Metacritic; it is the fifth-highest-rated PlayStation 3 game on Metacritic, and Remastered is the third-highest-rated PlayStation 4 game. The game appeared on several year-end lists of the best games of 2013, winning top honors at the 41st Annie Awards, 10th British Academy Video Games Awards, 17th Annual D.I.C.E. Awards, and 14th Annual Game Developers Choice Awards. It is considered one of the most significant seventh-generation video games, and has been included among the greatest video games of all time. The Last of Us PartII similarly received "universal acclaim" according to Metacritic. It won more than 320 Game of the Year awards, which several outlets deemed record-breaking, winning at The Game Awards 2020, 32nd GLAAD Media Awards, 38th Golden Joystick Awards, and 6th Annual Titanium Awards. Left Behind and PartI received "generally favorable reviews" according to Metacritic.

The Last of Us games have been praised for their stories. IGNs Colin Moriarty named it one of the first game's standout features, and PlayStation Official Magazines (OPM) David Meikleham wrote the pacing contributed to the story's impact. GameSpots Tom Mc Shea found Left Behinds story insightful, and GamesRadars Henry Gilbert described it as "intermittently intense, tragic, humorous, and even poignant". For PartII, Game Informers Andy McNamara felt the writers conveyed the themes "with careful nuance and unflinching emotion", and Push Squares Sammy Barker particularly praised the use of flashback and overlapping stories; conversely, GamesRadar+s Alex Avard felt the narrative lost its momentum by attempting to finalize every story thread, and Polygons Maddy Myers and Kotakus Riley MacLeod found the game repeatedly delivered its themes without allowing the player any agency in their decisions. Druckmann won several awards for his writing on the series, including two from the D.I.C.E. Awards, Game Developers Choice Awards, SXSW Gaming Awards, and Writers Guild of America Awards.

Critics praised the characters in the series. The relationship between Joel and Ellie in the first game was lauded; Game Informers Matt Helgeson found it identifiable and poignant, and OPMs David Meikleham considered them the best characters of any PlayStation 3 game. Praise was directed at Ellie and Riley's relationship in Left Behind, as well as Ellie and Dina's relationship in PartII. VG247s Kirk McKeand described every PartII character as "complex and human", and Destructoids Chris Carter felt empathetic to the main characters. The cast's performances were highly praised, particularly Troy Baker as Joel, Ashley Johnson as Ellie, and Laura Bailey as Abby: for The Last of Us, Baker won Best Voice Actor at Spike VGX and Johnson won the D.I.C.E. Award for Outstanding Character Performance. Johnson won two consecutive British Academy Games Awards for Performer for The Last of Us and Left Behind, and was nominated for the award for PartII, but lost to Bailey for her performance as Abby; Bailey won Best Performance at the Game Awards 2020 against Johnson.

Reviewers largely considered The Last of Us, PartII, and PartI graphical showcases for the PlayStation 3, PlayStation 4, and PlayStation 5, respectively. The first game's art design was lauded as "outstanding" by Computer and Video Gamess Andy Kelly, and "jaw-dropping" by Eurogamers Oli Welsh. The Guardians Keza MacDonald described PartIIs graphics as "meticulous and astounding". IGNs Jonathon Dornbush appreciated the world's ability to tell additional stories. The Verges Andrew Webster compared the improved graphics of PartI to modern blockbusters, and Siliconeras Josh Tolentino wrote it matched his memory of the original. The first game won the D.I.C.E. Award for Outstanding Achievement in Art Direction and PartII won Best Visual Design at the 38th Golden Joystick Awards; both games were nominated for the British Academy Games Award for Artistic Achievement and the Game Developers Choice Award for Best Visual Art. Part I won Outstanding Visual Effects in a Real-Time Project	at the 21st Visual Effects Society Awards.

Many reviewers found the game's combat a refreshing difference from other games. Game Informers Helgeson appreciated the vulnerability during fights, and IGNs Moriarty felt the crafting system assisted the combat, and the latter contributed to the narrative's emotional value by making enemies feel "human". Eurogamers Stace Harman commended Left Behinds ability to link gameplay to story, though a late-game gameplay sequence received some criticism for feeling unnatural and forced. GamesRadar+s Avard felt PartIIs new gameplay mechanics represented a level of care and authenticity demonstrative of Naughty Dog. GameRevolutions Michael Leri lauded the cohesiveness between gameplay and narrative, and the former's ability to create empathy. PartIs improvements to gameplay were praised for their realism and intensity; some reviewers found the combat failed to compare to PartIIs, though recognized it as a vast improvement of the original. The Last of Us won the Game Developers Choice Award for Best Design, for which the sequel was nominated. Both games were nominated for the British Academy Games Award for Game Design, and PartII won the inaugural Innovation in Accessibility award at The Game Awards 2020.

The use of sound in the games has been praised for its haunting impact on gameplay; Eurogamers Welsh considered the first game's sound design significantly better than in other games, and Vices Rob Zacny found PartIIs audio design made settings feel more lifelike in a way that the visuals occasionally failed to do. The use of 3D audio in PartI led some reviewers to play without sound or headphones; GamesRadar+s Avard found it made the Infected more terrifying. The first game won awards for sound design at the British Academy Games Awards, D.I.C.E. Awards, Game Audio Network Guild Awards, and SXSW Gaming Awards; the sequel won at the Game Audio Network Guild Awards and Golden Joystick Awards, and received nominations at several others. Santaolalla's score for both games was described as "haunting" by some reviewers; Destructoids Jim Sterling felt it complemented the gameplay in the first game, and IGNs Dornbush found it moving in the second. The first game won Excellence in Musical Score at the SXSW Gaming Awards, and the second won Best OST at the Titanium Awards; both games received music nominations at the British Academy Games Awards, Game Audio Network Guild Awards, and New York Game Awards.

The series has received praise for its depiction of female and LGBT characters. Edges Jason Killingsworth found the first game's lack of sexualized female characters refreshing, and Eurogamers Ellie Gibson praised Ellie as "sometimes strong, sometimes vulnerable, but never a cliché". GayGamer.nets Sam Einhorn felt the revelation of Bill's sexuality "added to his character ... without really tokenizing him", and American organization GLAAD named Bill one of the year's "most intriguing new LGBT characters". The kiss shared by Ellie and Riley in Left Behind was described as a "breakthrough moment" and "a big deal" by Kotakus Kirk Hamilton, and "beautiful and natural and funny" by IGNs Keza MacDonald. Some members of the transgender community objected to the representation of PartIIs Lev, a transgender supporting character; criticism focused on villains using his dead name, that the character was created by cisgender writers, and the use of trans stories as tragedies. VG247s Stacey Henly responded Lev's dead name is used sparingly and Ian Alexander, a transgender actor, provided the character's voice and motion capture; Pastes Waverly praised the choice to have Lev played by a transgender actor but felt there was too much emphasis on his gender identity and the suffering he experienced for it.

The Last of Us is one of the best-selling PlayStation 3 games, and Remastered and PartII are among the best-selling PlayStation 4 games. The first game sold over 1.3 million units within seven days, and 3.4 million within three weeks, becoming the biggest launch of an original game since 2011's L.A. Noire. It was the tenth-best-selling game of 2013. By April 2018, The Last of Us and Remastered had sold 17 million copies in total. The Last of Us PartII sold over four million copies worldwide in its release weekend, becoming the fastest-selling PlayStation 4 exclusive, beating Marvel's Spider-Mans 3.3million and God of Wars 3.1million in the same period. By June 2022, PartII had sold through over ten million copies worldwide. As of December 2022, the franchise had sold more than 37 million copies.

Notes

References

External links 
 

 
Action-adventure video games by series
Horror mass media franchises
Sony Interactive Entertainment franchises
Video games adapted into comics
Video games adapted into television shows
Video game franchises introduced in 2013